Katherine Marianne Sarafian (born January 27, 1969) is an Armenian-American film producer. She started at Pixar Animation Studios as an artist but was shifted from the art department to marketing during the making of A Bug's Life by Pixar head Steve Jobs. She then became a producer within Pixar.

Early life
Katherine Sarafian, the middle of three children, was raised in San Leandro, California, by her Armenian mother Alice Izmirian, active in San Leandro civic affairs, and Armenian father Richard Sarafian Jr., a pastor of the Saint Vartan Armenian Church of Oakland who died in 2009. Sarafian's Armenian heritage and religious upbringing, due to her father being a pastor, have been a central influence.

Career 
Sarafian produced Pixar's 2006 short film Lifted and its 2012 theatrical release Brave, for which she was nominated for the Producer's Guild Award for Outstanding Producer of an Animated Theatrical Motion Picture.

Sarafian and Brave's Director Mark Andrews accepted Brave's award for Best Animated Feature Film, at the Golden Globe award ceremony on January 13, 2013.

Personal life 
Katherine Marianne Sarafian lives in nearby Oakland with her husband, visual effects specialist Meher Gourjian, whose production credits include work in Harry Potter and whom she married during her six years of producing Brave. She gave birth to two sons during the six years of production time.

Producer filmography 
The Incredibles (2004) (assistant producer)
Lifted (2006) (producer)
Brave (2012) (producer)
Toy Story 4 (2019) (development producer)

Awards 
2013 Golden Globe, best animated feature film for "Brave"
2013 85th Academy Awards, best animated feature film for "Brave"

References

External links
 

1969 births
Living people
American women film producers
Film producers from California
People from San Leandro, California
American people of Armenian descent
Pixar people